Connie Crothers (May 2, 1941 – August 13, 2016) was an American jazz improviser and pianist.

Early life
Crothers began studying classical piano at age 9 and went on to major in composition at the University of California, Berkeley. At Berkeley, her teachers emphasized "procedure and structure" and "compositional rigor" over emotional expression, which did not sit well with Crothers. Inspired by his recording of "C Minor Complex," one of the first examples on record of free improvisation, she relocated to New York City to become a student of Lennie Tristano.

Later life and career
After Tristano's death in November 1978, Crothers founded the Lennie Jazz Foundation and recorded a memorial concert album in his honor.

In 1982, she recorded an album with drummer Max Roach for New Artists Records, a label she and Roach founded. She also recorded in groups with, among others, Richard Tabnik and Cameron Brown.

Crothers died of lung cancer in Manhattan on August 13, 2016.

Discography

As leader/co-leader

Sources:

As sidewoman
 1992? Lennie Tristano Memorial Concert, Tristanos Disciples
 1999? The Way I Am, Linda Satin
 2002? Primal Elegance, Bud Tristano

References

External links
 Official website
 Jazz in the New Depression: Interview with Connie Crothers
 New York Times obituary
 NewMusicBox obituary

1941 births
2016 deaths
American jazz pianists
American women pianists
University of California, Berkeley alumni
Women jazz pianists
RogueArt artists
Deaths from lung cancer in New York (state)
21st-century American women